William Leslie "Les" Thomas Williams (10 May 1922 – 27 January 2006) was a Welsh dual-code international rugby union, and professional rugby league footballer who played in the 1940s and 1950s.

Background
Williams was born in Mynydd-y-Garreg, Wales, and he died aged 83 in Falmouth, Cornwall, England.

International honours
Williams won 15 caps for Wales (RU) in 1949–1953 while at Llanelli RFC in 1947 against England, Scotland, France, and Ireland, and while at Cardiff RFC in 1947 against Australia, in 1948 against Ireland, and in 1949 against England, and won caps for Wales (RL) while at Hunslet.

References

External links
Welsh stars still had a rugby ball in wartime
Llanelli's rainbow warriors supreme in scarlet
Telegraph Obituary - Les Williams

1922 births
2006 deaths
Cardiff RFC players
Dual-code rugby internationals
Great Britain national rugby league team players
Hunslet F.C. (1883) players
Llanelli RFC players
Rugby league players from Carmarthenshire
Rugby league wingers
Rugby union centres
Rugby union players from Carmarthenshire
Rugby union wings
Wales international rugby union players
Wales national rugby league team players
Welsh rugby league players
Welsh rugby union players